List of presidents of the National Assembly of Burkina Faso.

Below is a list of presidents of Conseil-General:

Below is a list of presidents of the Territorial Assembly:

Below is a list of presidents of the Constituent Assembly:

Below is a list of presidents of the National Assembly:

Notes
Lt.-Gen. Windpanga Samandoulougou was Chairman of a Consultative Committee of 41 members after the military coup in 1966.

See also
National Assembly of Burkina Faso
Chamber of Representatives of Burkina Faso

References

 Official website of the National Assembly of Burkina Faso

Politics of Burkina Faso
Burkina Faso